Qaleh-ye Now (also Romanized as Qal‘eh-ye Now and Qal‘eh Now) is a village in Halil Rural District, in the Central District of Jiroft County, Kerman Province, Iran. At the 2006 census, its population was 584, in 130 families.

References 

Populated places in Jiroft County